Viriat is a commune in the Ain department of eastern France.

History
Settlement there goes back to at least the Celtic period.

In the twelfth century, the name "Viriacus" appears in a record, referring to church and a priory.

Population

Twin towns
Viriat is twinned with:

  Voinești, Vaslui, Romania, since 1989
  Sorbolo, Italy, since 2000

See also
Communes of the Ain department

References

External links

 Official website

Communes of Ain
Bresse
Ain communes articles needing translation from French Wikipedia